Bernard Qualtrough is a fictional British spy appearing in series 7 of the BBC television drama Spooks (known as MI-5 in the United States). The character was played by Richard Johnson.

In series 7, Bernard is in his retirement and is approached by his protégé Harry Pearce about operation Sugar Horse. This operation recruited sleeper agents in the (then) Soviet Union so they would rise to positions of influence before being activated. Harry is concerned that the operation, which he describes as the most important that MI5 has undertaken, has been compromised.

Bernard suggests Connie James as a likely suspect after dismissing the possibility that Richard Dolby could have betrayed the operation.

Harry arranges for Connie's home to be searched and eventually, after a confrontation with her, discovers a cassette tape from the deceased head of the operation saying that Connie knew nothing of matters that he had discussed with Harry.

Harry accepts this as proof of Connie's innocence but is eventually persuaded by Lucas North that Bernard is a mole. Lucas tells Harry that while imprisoned in Russia, he heard the Russian codename Pilgrim used during his interrogation by the FSB, and he has found evidence in the archive that points to Bernard.

Eventually it turns out that both Bernard and Connie were working in concert for the FSB. Although Connie dies at the end of series 7, the fate of her co-conspirator is not made clear.

Spooks (TV series) characters
Fictional secret agents and spies